2MASS J03552337+1133437 (2MASS J0355+11) is a nearby brown dwarf of spectral type L5γ, located in constellation Taurus at approximately 29.8 light-years from Earth.

Characteristics
2MASS J0355+11 was discovered in 2006 by Reid et al.

It is radio-quiet brown dwarf, indicating an absence of stellar flares. Its carbon to oxygen ratio, equals to 0.56, is similar to that of Sun's.

The interstellar comet 2I/Borisov has passed 1.4 light-years (0.44 parsecs) from 2MASS J0355+11 280 thousand years before arriving to the Solar System.

See also
 List of star systems within 25–30 light-years

References

Further reading

Taurus (constellation)
Brown dwarfs
L-type stars
J03552337+1133437
SDSS objects
?